Clinton Township is the name of some places in the U.S. state of Minnesota:
Clinton Township, Rock County, Minnesota
Clinton Township, St. Louis County, Minnesota

See also
Clinton Township (disambiguation)
Minnesota township disambiguation pages